Kristie Macosko Krieger (born in 1970) is an American film producer, best known for her work alongside director Steven Spielberg. She worked as his assistant (or "associate") starting with the 1998 documentary film The Last Days, and then on his own films from 2001's A.I. Artificial Intelligence to 2011's The Adventures of Tintin. She also became producer on Spielberg's films starting with 2008's Indiana Jones and the Kingdom of the Crystal Skull. For 2015's Bridge of Spies, 2017's The Post, 2021's West Side Story, and 2022's The Fabelmans, she received Academy Award nominations for Best Picture.

Filmography 
She was a producer in all films unless otherwise noted.

Film

Miscellaneous crew

Television

Miscellaneous crew

Thanks

References

External links 
 

Living people
American women film producers
American film producers
Golden Globe Award-winning producers
Year of birth missing (living people)
Place of birth missing (living people)
University of California, Davis alumni
21st-century American women
1970 births